The 75th Regiment Illinois Volunteer Infantry was an infantry regiment that served in the Union Army during the American Civil War.

Service
75th Regiment Illinois  was organized at Dixon, Illinois and mustered into Federal service on September 2, 1862.

The regiment was discharged from service on June 12, 1865.

Total strength and casualties
The regiment lost 3 officers and 94 enlisted men killed in action or died of wounds and 5 officers and 103 enlisted men who died of disease, for a total of 205 fatalities.

Commanders
Colonel George Ryan - Resigned December 20, 1862.
Colonel John E. Bennett - Mustered out with the regiment.

See also
List of Illinois Civil War Units
Illinois in the American Civil War

Notes

References
The Civil War Archive

Units and formations of the Union Army from Illinois
1862 establishments in Illinois
Military units and formations established in 1862
Military units and formations disestablished in 1865